The elegant wrasse, Anampses elegans, is a species of wrasse native to the Pacific Ocean from Australia and New Zealand eastward to Easter Island. It can be found in the aquarium trade.

References

 Tony Ayling & Geoffrey Cox, Collins Guide to the Sea Fishes of New Zealand,  (William Collins Publishers Ltd., Auckland, New Zealand 1982) 

Elegant wrasse
Taxa named by James Douglas Ogilby
Fish described in 1889